Tim Latham (born November 18, 1966) is a Grammy Award-winning American recording engineer working in the music industry. Latham attended Berklee College of Music in the 1980s.

In 2008 Latham shared a Grammy Award for Best Musical Theater Album with Joel Moss for their work on the recording of the Broadway theatre production of In The Heights.

Select Discography

References

1966 births
Living people
People from Queens, New York
American audio engineers
Grammy Award winners
Engineers from New York City
Berklee College of Music alumni